The 2001 Waterford Senior Hurling Championship was the 101st staging of the Waterford Senior Hurling Championship since its establishment by the Waterford County Board in 1897. The draw for the opening round fixtures took place on 5 February 2001. The championship began on 27 April 2001 and ended on 17 September 2001.

Mount Sion were the defending champions, however, they were defeated by Lismore in a semi-final replay.

On 17 September 2001, Ballygunner won the championship after a 4-12 to 1-16 defeat of Lismore in the final at Walsh Park.  It was their 9th championship title overall and their first title since 1999.

Lismore's Dave Bennett was the championship's top scorer with 1-45.

Team changes

To Championship

Promoted from the Waterford Intermediate Hurling Championship
 Ballyduff Lower

From Championship

Relegated to the Waterford Intermediate Hurling Championship
 Erin's Own

Results

First round

Second round

Relegation play-offs

Losers' group

Quarter-final

Semi-finals

Final

Championship statistics

Top scorers

Top scorers overall

Top scorers in a single game

References

Waterford
Waterford Senior Hurling Championship